The Stoner Creek Rural Historic District, in Bourbon County, Kentucky near Paris, Kentucky, is a  historic district which was listed on the National Register of Historic Places in 2001.

It included 526 contributing buildings, 207 contributing structures, seven contributing objects and 33 contributing sites.

It includes work by landscape architect Jens Jensen.

Non-contributing resources include 367 buildings, 52 structures, and three sites.

It includes 10 historic farms. Each farm being known for its own specific thing.

Claiborne
Xalapa
Highland, post-World War II
Stonerside, post-World War II
Norton Clay Farm
Homer Short Farm

Ones larger than  include:
Auvergne, which has an antebellum main house and core of farmstead
Hillside
Hidaway
Hunterton, pre-World War II
Golden Chance, pre-World War II
Green Valley

It runs along Winchester, Stoney Point, Spears Mill, and N. Middletown Roads.

References

Historic districts on the National Register of Historic Places in Kentucky
National Register of Historic Places in Bourbon County, Kentucky
Georgian architecture in Kentucky
Buildings and structures completed in 1840